"All That (Lady)" is a song by American rapper The Game, released as the second single from his fifth studio album Jesus Piece. The song features additional vocals from fellow rappers Lil Wayne, Big Sean, Fabolous and American singer/rapper Jeremih. The song contains a clear vocal sample of "Lady" by D'Angelo. The week of the album's release the song "All That (Lady)" debuted at number 48 on the Billboard R&B/Hip-Hop Songs chart.

Background 
On December 4, 2012 Game premiered the song on Power 106's Big Boy Neighborhood in promotion of Jesus Piece. After that it had been rumored to be the second single and Game announced he would shoot a video for it. Then on February 19, 2013 the song was sent to radio as the second official single.

Music video 
During the week of the BET Awards 2013 Game shot the music video for the single along with Big Sean and Jeremih. The music video for "All That (Lady)" was released on November 1, 2013, shortly after his announcement of signing to Cash Money Records. Lil Wayne and Fabolous do not make appearances in the video.

Critical reception 
"All That (Lady)" received generally positive reviews from music critics. Leading up to the release of the album, Game would post a text message he received from Dr. Dre where Dre praised the song. XXL praised the songs soulful instrumental and Lil Wayne's guest verse. The New York Times also praised Wayne's verse on the song. PopMatters praised all the artists verses and the D'Angelo sample.

Charts

References 

2012 songs
2013 singles
The Game (rapper) songs
Lil Wayne songs
Big Sean songs
Fabolous songs
Jeremih songs
Interscope Records singles
Songs written by Cool (record producer)
Song recordings produced by Cool & Dre
Songs written by Jeremih
Songs written by The Game (rapper)
Songs written by Dre (record producer)